Carleton station was a Via Rail station in Carleton-sur-Mer, Quebec, Canada. It was staffed with limited wheelchair accessibility and served the Montreal–Gaspé train. , the Gaspé train is not running; the closest passenger rail service is provided at the Matapédia station. It is unknown if or when service to Gaspé will resume.

References

External links

Carleton-sur-Mer
Railway stations in Gaspésie–Îles-de-la-Madeleine
Via Rail stations in Quebec
Disused railway stations in Canada
Railway stations closed in 2013